Jesse Turnbow (October 8, 1956 – November 27, 2018) was an American football defensive tackle. He played for the Cleveland Browns in 1978.

He died on November 27, 2018, in Cincinnati, Ohio at age 62.

References

1956 births
2018 deaths
American football defensive tackles
Tennessee Volunteers football players
Cleveland Browns players